The following is a timeline of the history of the city of Münster, North Rhine-Westphalia, Germany.

Prior to 19th century

 797 - School founded.
 800 - Roman Catholic Diocese of Münster established.
 800's - Charlemagne made it the residence of Saint Ludger, the newly appointed bishop of the Saxons.
 1040 - Überwasserkirche convent founded.
 1070 - Church of St Maurice founded.
 1170 - Church of St Ludgerus erected. 
 1180
 Prince-Bishopric of Münster established.
 Municipal charter received.
 13th C. - Member of the Hanseatic League. 
 1250 - Town Hall in use (approximate date).
 1264 - Münster Cathedral built.
 1340 - Our Lady's Church built.
 1444 -  (béguinage) founded.
 1450 - Münster Diocesan Feud begins.
 1458 -  (cloth inspection entity) established (approximate date).
 1485 - Printing press in operation.
 1532 - Protestant Reformation.
 1534 - February: Münster Rebellion; Anabaptists in power.
 1588 -  founded.
 1589
  (guild hall) built.
 Jesuit College's  (library) active.
 1617 -  construction begins on the Stubengasse.
 1630 -  (militia) formed.
 1648 - Dutch-Spanish peace treaty signed in Munster.
 1661 - Forces of Christoph Bernhard von Galen occupy Munster.
 1662 -  built.
 1665 - An alliance with Christoph Bernhard von Galen was sought by the English against Holland.
 1720 -  publisher in business.
 1759 - City besieged by Hanoverian forces during the Seven Years' War.
 1780 - University of Münster founded.
 1787 - Schloss Münster (palace) built.
 1800 -  founded.

19th century
 1803
 Münster Regierungsbezirk (administrative region) established.
 Botanischer Garten Münster established.
 The bishopric was secularized and annexed to Prussia.
 1806 - French in power.
 1810 - Münster "annexed to France."
 1815 - Münster "ceded to Prussia" per Congress of Vienna.
 1816 - Population: 17,316.
 1825 -  (historical society) founded.
 1829 -  (regional archive) established.
 1835 - "Revidierte Städteordnung" (city self-administration) in effect.
 1848
 25 May: Münster–Hamm railway begins operating.
 Münster Hauptbahnhof opens.
 1861 - Population: 27,332 (city).
 1874 - Wanne-Eickel–Hamburg railway in operation.
 1875
 Lamberti, St. Mauritz, and Überwasser become part of city.
  established.
 1880 - Population: 40,434.
 1885 - Population: 44,060.
 1890 - Münster Hauptbahnhof opened.
 1892 - Westfälisches Museum für Naturkunde opens.
 1895
 Lortzing-Theater opens.
 Population: 57,135.
 1897 -  (newspaper) in publication.
 1899 -  and Dortmund–Ems Canal open.

20th century

 1901
 Tram begins operating.
  established.
 1905 - Population: 81,468.
 1906 -  (library) and SC Preußen Münster (football club) founded.
 1908 - Westphalian State Museum opens.
 1919
  founded.
 Population: 100,452.
 1926 - Halle Münsterland and Preußenstadion (stadium) open.
 1929 -  (regional history institute) founded.
 1940
 16 May: Bombing of city by Allied forces begins.(de)
 Population: 144,945.
 1946 -  newspaper begins publication.
 1947 - Reconstruction of Prinzipalmarkt begins.
 1948 - University of Münster's  established.
 1956 - Städtische Bühnen Münster (theatre) built.
 1958 - Old City Hall reconstructed.
 1960
 City twinned with Orléans, France.
 Population: 180,117.
 1971 - Fachhochschule Münster established.
 1972 - Münster/Osnabrück Airport begins operating.
 1974 - Population: 200,448.
 1975
  becomes part of city.
 Population: 264,546.
 1977
  pedestrianized.
 Skulptur Projekte Münster begins.
 1979
  founded.
  created.
 1981 -  begins.
 1984 -  becomes mayor.
 1985 - Fernmeldeturm Münster (TV tower) erected.
 1987 - Catholic pope visits city.
 1993
  survey begins.
  opens.
 1994 -  becomes mayor.
 1999 -  becomes mayor.

21st century

 2003 -  mosque opens in Hiltrup.
 2005 -  begins operating.
 2007 - January: Storm.
 2009 -  becomes mayor.
 2010 - Population: 279,803.
 2012 - British military stationed in York Barracks in Gremmendorf depart.
 2018 - 2018 Münster attack.

See also
 History of Münster
 
 
 Timelines of other cities in the state of North Rhine-Westphalia:(de) Aachen, Bonn, Cologne, Dortmund, Duisburg, Düsseldorf, Essen

References

This article incorporates information from the German Wikipedia.

Bibliography

in English

in German
  
 
 
  (bibliography)

External links

 Links to fulltext city directories for Munster via Wikisource
 Europeana. Items related to Münster, various dates.
 Digital Public Library of America. Items related to Münster, various dates

 
Munster